George Herman may refer to:

George Herman (journalist) (1920–2005), CBS journalist
George Herman (playwright) (born 1928), playwright and author

See also
George Herman Ruth (1895–1948), American baseball player